The 1871 Roslyn by-election was a by-election for the electorate of Roslyn in Dunedin on 12 September 1871 during the 5th New Zealand Parliament.

The by-election resulted from the resignation of the previous member Henry Driver on 15 August 1871.

The by-election was won by Edward McGlashan. Five candidates contested the by-election.

Results
The following table gives the election results:

References

Roslyn 1871
1871 elections in New Zealand
Politics of Dunedin
September 1871 events
1870s in Dunedin